The 1992 West Coast Conference men's basketball tournament was held March 7–9 at the Chiles Center on the campus of the University of Portland in Portland, Oregon. This was the sixth edition of the tournament.

Top seed Pepperdine defeated #4 seed Gonzaga 73–70 in the championship game to successfully defend their WCC tournament title. Runner-up Gonzaga had been winless in the first five editions, losing its opener (quarterfinal) each year.

The Waves earned the automatic bid to the 64-team NCAA tournament and were seeded eleventh in the Midwest regional.

Bracket

References

West Coast Conference men's basketball tournament
Tournament
West Coast Athletic Conference men's basketball tournament
West Coast Athletic Conference men's basketball tournament